Chandavalliya Thota is a 1964 Indian Kannada language film, directed by T. V. Singh Thakur. It stars Rajkumar, Udaykumar and Jayanthi. Film was release on 24 June 1964and ran for a hundred days at Prabhat Cinema in Bangalore. The film won many laurels upon release including the National Film Award for Best Feature Film in Kannada for its Gandhian theme treatment of the poverty in rural Indian villages. The movie is based on the novel of same name by Ta.Ra.Su. This movie was the debut movie of singer K. J. Yesudas in Kannada.

Plot
Through the efforts of two close friends and revered village heads, Sivananjay Gowda and Naraharappa, a coconut grove is raised to cool down the arid village with vegetation. Gowda, owner of grove, follows his astrologer’s advice and makes a “daan” of grove to his friend Narahari to escape his doom. Then, a priest and his wife scheme to grab the grove. A local tramp, Kariyappa, joins them whose evil designs are to appropriate all that Gowda possesses. The schemers entice Rama, Gowda’s prodigal son, and even maneuvre his marriage with Lakshmi. Eventually they succeed in sowing discord and bringing about a separation in the family. Rama demands and gets lion’s share in the property which he promptly squanders away.

Cast
 Rajkumar as Hanuman, Sivananjay Gowda's first son
 Udaykumar as Sivananjay Gowda
 Jayanthi as Cheney 
 Rajasree as Champa 
 Balakrishna as Kariyappa
 Raghavendra Rao
 Advani Lakshmi Devi as Lakshmi
 M. Jayashree as Puttathayi, Sivananjay Gowda's wife
 Shanthamma as Parvathi, Naraharappan's wife
 Sharadamma as Papamma, priest's wife

Soundtrack
The music was composed by T. G. Lingappa, with lyrics by R. N. Jayagopal and Ta Ra Su.

Awards
 National Film Award for Best Feature Film in Kannada - 1964
 This film screened at IFFI 1992 Kannada cinema Retrospect.

References

External links
 
 

1964 films
1960s Kannada-language films
Films based on Indian novels
Films scored by T. G. Lingappa
Best Kannada Feature Film National Film Award winners